A partial solar eclipse occurred on November 2, 1910. A solar eclipse occurs when the Moon passes between Earth and the Sun, thereby totally or partly obscuring the image of the Sun for a viewer on Earth. A partial solar eclipse occurs in the polar regions of the Earth when the center of the Moon's shadow misses the Earth.

Related eclipses

Solar eclipses of 1910–1913

References

External links 

1910 11 2
1910 in science
1910 11 2
November 1910 events